The UGTAN-unitaire was a trade union centre in Senegal. UGTAN-unitaire was formed in January 1959 through a split away from UGTAN. The founder of UGTAN-unitaire was Alioune Cissé, erstwhile UGTAN general secretary. UGTAN-unitaire wanted to unite West African trade unions within the French Community, but maintain independence from external international bodies. Later in 1959, UGTAN-unitaire merged with another UGTAN splinter group, UGTAN-autonome, to form UGTS.

References

Trade unions in Senegal
1959 establishments in Senegal
National federations of trade unions
Defunct trade unions of Africa

Trade unions established in 1959
Defunct organisations based in Senegal